John Hutton (born 1928) is a British writer of crime and thriller novels. He was born in Manchester and educated at Burnage Grammar School and the University of Wales. He has been a teacher and a senior lecturer in English.

Bibliography 
 29, Herriott Street (1979)
 Accidental Crimes (1983); Gold Dagger Award

References

1928 births
Living people
Writers from Manchester
English crime fiction writers
English male novelists